Sphenopus (common name coastal grass), is a genus of Asian and Mediterranean plants in the grass family.

 Species
 Sphenopus divaricatus (Gouan) Rchb. - Mediterranean and adjacent regions from Canary Islands and Portugal to Tajikistan
 Sphenopus ehrenbergii Hausskn. - Libya, Tunisia

References

Pooideae
Poaceae genera